was an immigrant clan active in Japan since the Kofun period (250–538), according to the history of Japan laid out in Nihon Shoki.

Hata is the Japanese reading of the Chinese surname Qin given to the State of Qin and the Qin dynasty (the ancestral name was Ying), and to their descendants established in Japan. The Nihon Shoki presents the Hata as a clan or house, and not as a tribe; only the members of the head family had the right to use the name of Hata.

The Hata can be compared to other families who came from the continent during the Kofun period: the descendants of the Chinese Han dynasty, through Prince Achi no Omi, ancestor of the Aya clan, the Sakanoue clan, the Tamura clan, the Harada, and the Akizuki clan, as well as the descendants of the Chinese Cao Wei Dynasty through the Takamuko clan.

Origins
The Hata are said to have come to Japan from China through the Chinese Lelang Commandery, then through the Kingdom of Baekje (both on the Korean peninsula). Lelang, near what is today Pyongyang, was the greatest of the Four Commanderies of Han created in 108 BC in the areas captured after the conquest of the Wiman Joseon state (194 BC – 108 BC), which corresponds to the current North Korea, by Emperor Wu of the Chinese Han dynasty. A flux of Chinese immigration into the Korean peninsula continued without cessation, implanting Chinese culture and technology there.  Some scholars say the Hata clan did not come from Baekje, but from the Silla or Gaya area.

The first leader of the Hata in Japan, Uzumasa-no-Kimi-Sukune, arrived during the reign of Emperor Chūai, in the 2nd century CE. According to the Nihon Shoki, a Heian-period Japanese chronicle, he and his followers were greeted warmly, and Uzumasa was granted a high government position.

Roughly one hundred years later, during the reign of Emperor Ōjin, visited Japan from the Kingdom of Baekje, in Korea. He had long wanted to emigrate to Japan, but the Kingdom of Silla would not permit him to do so. Having enjoyed the experience of meeting 120 people of his clan at Mimana.

Yuzuki no Kimi left Japan but soon returned, in 283, with additional members of his clan "from 120 districts of his own land", as well as a massive hoard of treasures, including jewels, exotic textiles, and silver and gold, which were presented to the Emperor as a gift. The Hata are said to be descended from Yuzuki no kimi, who was allegedly a descendant of Qin Shi Huang, the first emperor of the Qin Dynasty.

Spread
The Hata were the most prominent inhabitants of the Kyoto basin at the time the area entered into history, in the 6th and 7th centuries.

The Hata are said to have been adept at financial matters, and to have introduced silk raising and weaving to Japan. For this reason, they may have been associated with the kagome crest, a lattice shape found in basket-weaving. During the reign of Emperor Nintoku (313-399), the members of the clan were sent to different parts of the country to spread the knowledge and practice of sericulture. Members of this clan also served as financial advisors to the Yamato Court for several centuries. Originally landing and settling in Izumo and the San'yō region, the Hata eventually settled in the areas where Japan's most important cities are now. They are said to have aided in the establishment of Heian-kyō (modern-day Kyoto), and of many Shinto shrines and Buddhist temples, including Fushimi Inari Taisha, Matsunoo Taisha, and Kōryū-ji. Emperor Yūryaku granted the clan the family name of Uzumasa in 471, in honor of Sake no kimi's contributions to the spread of sericulture. Over the next few centuries, they were given the right to the status (kabane) of Miyatsuko, and later Imiki.

A number of samurai clans, including the Chōsokabe clan of Shikoku, the Kawakatsu clan of Tanba, and the Jinbō clan of Echigo province, claimed descent from the Hata. The Koremune clan, also allegedly descended from the Emperor of Qin, were related to the Hata as well. Prince Koman-O came to dwell in Japan in the reign of Emperor Ōjin (c. 310). His successors received the name Hata. This name was changed to Koremune in 880. The wife of Shimazu Tadahisa (1179–1227) (son of Minamoto no Yoritomo and ancestor of the Shimazu clan of Kyūshū), was a daughter of Koremune Hironobu.

The population of Neyagawa in Osaka Prefecture includes a number of people who claim descent from the Hata. The cities of Ōhata and Yahata are not directly related to Hata clan.

The Hata were also claimed as ancestors by Zeami Motokiyo, the premiere Noh playwright in history, who attributed the origins of Noh to Hata no Kawakatsu. According to Zeami's writings, Kōkatsu, the ancestor of both the Kanze and Komparu Noh lineages, introduced ritual dances to Japan in the sixth century; this form would later evolve into Okina and then into Noh. A more important influence upon the formation and the character of Noh is the Chinese Nuo rite. While sanyue (sangaku) and daqu influenced the  development of Noh in terms of dramatic structure and presentation, the Nuo rite played a significant role in formulating Noh's religious and ritualistic character and features.

Genealogy

Jewish ancestry theory

The hypothesis that the Hata clan were a Jewish Nestorian tribe was proposed by Saeki Yoshiro in 1908. Saeki developed a theory described by Ben-Ami Shillony as being "somewhat similar" to that advanced by Norman McLeod in 1879.

In 1879 the Scottish businessman Norman McLeod, who had lived in Japan since 1867, published in Nagasaki Japan and the Lost Tribes of Israel. Based on "personal research and observation", the book identified the Japanese as the descendants of the Ten Lost Tribes...
Over thirty years later, in 1908, Saeki Yoshiro (1872-1965), a Waseda University professor, a Christian, and expert on Chinese Nestorians, published a book in which he developed a somewhat similar theory. According to Saeki, the Hata clan, which arrived from Korea and settled in Japan in the third century, was a Jewish-Nestorian tribe... Saeki's writings spread the theory about "the common ancestry of the Japanese and the Jews" (Nichi-Yu dosoron) in Japan, a theory that was endorsed by some Christian groups.

There is no evidence available, including modern DNA analysis, to support this hypothesis. A recently published study of the genetic origins of Japanese people does not support a genealogical link as put forward by Saeki. Researcher and author Jon Entine emphasizes that DNA evidence excludes the possibility of significant links between Japanese and Jews.

Hata tribe members of note
 Hata no Kawakatsu

See also

 Yíng (Chinese surname)
 Zhao (surname)
 Kaifeng Jews
 British Israelism (a similar hypothesis that holds the British people to be a Lost Tribe of Israel)
 Ten Lost Tribes
 Genetic studies on Jews

Citations

References
 Frederic, Louis (2002). "Japan Encyclopedia." Cambridge, Massachusetts: Harvard University Press.
 Rimer, J. Thomas and Yamazaki Masakazu trans. (1984). "On the Art of the Nō Drama: The Major Treatises of Zeami." Princeton, New Jersey: Princeton University Press.
 Teshima, Ikuro (1973). The Ancient Refugees From Religious Persecution in Japan: The Tribe of Hada - Their Religious and Cultural Influence. 1.

Aristocracy of ancient Japan
Japanese clans
People of Kofun-period Japan
Japanese people of Chinese descent